Guadiana may refer to:

 Guadiana, a river in southern Spain and Portugal
 Ojos del Guadiana 
 Guadiana Valley Natural Park, a natural park in southeastern Portugal
 Guadiana International Bridge
  Guadiana, Naranjito, Puerto Rico, a barrio of Naranjito, Puerto Rico
 Guadiana, Badajoz, a town and municipality in Extremadura, Spain (formerly Guadiana del Caudillo)
 Guadiana River (Puerto Rico), a river in Puerto Rico
 Guadiana Bay, a bay in western Cuba
 Ribera del Guadiana, a Spanish protected designation of origin (Denominación de Origen - DO) for wines in Extremadura
 Guadiana Trophy, an annual football (soccer) tournament hosted by Portugal and played in the pre-season